Gordon Arthur Berenson (born December 8, 1939), most commonly known as Red Berenson, is a Canadian former professional ice hockey centre and head coach of the Michigan Wolverines men's ice hockey team from 1984 to 2017. Berenson was inducted into Canada's Sports Hall of Fame in 2005 and the United States Hockey Hall of Fame in 2018.

Playing career
Berenson played junior ice hockey with the Regina Pats, participating in two Memorial Cups in 1956 and 1958. In 1959, Berenson played for the world champion Belleville McFarlands.

Berenson moved on to, and graduated from, Michigan's School of Business and played collegiately at the University of Michigan, winning All-American honors there with an NCAA-leading 43 goals in his final year.

Berenson signed thereafter with the Montreal Canadiens, playing five years in their system and being on a Stanley Cup-winning squad in 1965 before being traded to the New York Rangers, where he played parts of two seasons without success.

Seven weeks into the 1967/1968 NHL season, the St. Louis Blues acquired Berenson and Barclay Plager from the New York Rangers. It was with the Blues where Berenson became one of the new Western Division's first great stars, leading the Blues to three straight Stanley Cup finals and being named the division's best player by his peers in The Sporting News' annual poll each of those years.

Berenson's most notable scoring feat came on November 7, 1968, in a road game against the Philadelphia Flyers. Berenson scored six goals, including four over a nine-minute span. He became the first player to score a double hat trick on a road game. The six-goal total was one shy of the all-time NHL record (set by Joe Malone in 1920), and has been accomplished only once since.

Berenson was named team captain in 1970; however, as he was already 31 years old, the Blues felt his skills were in decline, and traded him in what was considered a shocking deal to the Detroit Red Wings, a multi-player trade receiving centre Garry Unger in return. He was an impact player for Detroit for four seasons, but was having a poor fifth season when he was dealt back to the Blues. The trade rejuvenated him, and he was an effective player for three and a half seasons back in St. Louis before he retired after the 1977–1978 campaign.

Berenson played in the legendary eight-game Summit Series for Team Canada against the Soviet Union in 1972, as well as in the “old-timers” rematch of the Canada Cup in 1987. He played in six NHL All-Star Games.

Altogether, in 17 NHL seasons, Berenson recorded 261 goals and 397 assists in 987 games.

Coaching career
Berenson retired from playing in 1978 and joined the Blues' coaching staff. He became the team's head coach midway through the 1979–80 season. A year later, he won the Jack Adams Award as the NHL's Coach of the Year. 

Berenson returned to his alma mater as head coach in 1984 and remained in the position for 33 seasons. He led the Wolverines to 11 Frozen Four appearances, and NCAA championships in 1996 and 1998. In CCHA competition, his teams have won 11 regular-season and 9 tournament titles. In addition, Berenson's squads qualified for the NCAA tournament for 22 consecutive seasons from 1991 to 2012.  This is the longest streak ever in college hockey history. The Wolverines have also won 15 Great Lakes Invitational titles under Berenson.

On January 10, 2015, Berenson became the fourth coach in Division I men's hockey history reach 800 career wins. Berenson was named the 2015–16 Big Ten Coach of the Year after leading the Wolverines to a 22–7–5 regular-season record, including a 12–5–3–2 record in Big Ten play.

On April 10, 2017, Berenson announced his retirement as head coach of the Michigan Wolverine men's ice hockey team after 33 years. He finished his career with an 848–426–92 record in 1,366 games, and helped lead Michigan to a record 36 NCAA tournament appearances.

Awards and honors

Career statistics

Regular season and playoffs

International

Head coaching record

NHL

College

See also
List of college men's ice hockey coaches with 400 wins
 List of players with 5 or more goals in an NHL game
 University of Michigan Athletic Hall of Honor

References

External links

Red of the Blues – TIME
Profile from University of Michigan official site

1939 births
Living people
Buffalo Sabres coaches
Canada men's national ice hockey team coaches
Canada men's national ice hockey team players
Canadian expatriate ice hockey players in the United States
Canadian ice hockey centres
Canadian ice hockey coaches
Canadian people of Swedish descent
Detroit Red Wings captains
Detroit Red Wings players
Flin Flon Bombers players
Ice hockey people from Saskatchewan
Jack Adams Award winners
Lester Patrick Trophy recipients
Michigan Wolverines men's ice hockey coaches
Michigan Wolverines men's ice hockey players
Montreal Canadiens players
New York Rangers players
Regina Pats players
Ross School of Business alumni
St. Louis Blues coaches
St. Louis Blues players
Sportspeople from Regina, Saskatchewan
Stanley Cup champions
AHCA Division I men's ice hockey All-Americans